Nhandeara is a municipality in the state of São Paulo, Brazil. The city has a population of 11,527 inhabitants and an area of 435.8 km².

Economy

The Tertiary sector is the economic basis of Nhandeara. Commerce, services and public administration corresponds to 62.3% of the city GDP. The Secondary sector is 19.4% of the GDP, and the Primary sector corresponds to 18.2%.

Demographics

Health 
Hospitals: 1

Infrastructure 
Bank agencies: 4
Industries: 67
Commercial establishments: 279
Services: 161

Transportation
SP-310 Rodovia Feliciano Sales Cunha
SP-461

References

Populated places established in 1944
Municipalities in São Paulo (state)